Amillarus secundus is a species of beetle in the family Cerambycidae. It was described by Tippmann in 1951.

References

Agapanthiini
Beetles described in 1951